San Juan y Martínez Municipal Museum is a museum located in the Francisco Riveras street in San Juan y Martínez, Cuba.

It holds sections on history, numismatics, ethnology and weaponry.

See also 
 List of museums in Cuba

References 

Museums in Cuba
Buildings and structures in Pinar del Río Province